The Marrakesh VIP Treaty (formally the Marrakesh Treaty to Facilitate Access to Published Works for Persons who are Blind, Visually Impaired or Otherwise Print Disabled, colloquially Marrakesh Treaty or MVT) is a treaty on copyright adopted in Marrakesh, Morocco, on 27 June 2013. It achieved the deposit of 20 instruments of ratification or accession by eligible parties needed for entry into force on June 30, 2016 and entered into force three months later, on September 30, 2016. As of February 2023, the treaty has 92 contracting parties covering 118 WIPO Member States because the European Union joined as a block.

History 
The treaty seeks to remedy a "book famine" for people who are unable to access standard print materials. Before the implementation of the treaty, the World Blind Union estimated that over 90% of copyrighted works were not produced in accessible formats; in developing countries, this number drops to around 1% of published materials.

Before the treaty was signed, under one third of countries provided a copyright exception to allow the sharing of works to people with disabilities without the copyright holders permission. However, even when these copyright exemptions were present, individual countries could not share materials between themselves. As an example, the World Blind Union notes: "In Spain, for example, there are approximately 100,000 accessible books, whereas Argentina has only about 25,000. Yet Spain's accessible books cannot be exported legally to Argentina or to other Spanish-speaking countries." Additionally, where copyright exemptions did exist, they were not always uniform in nature. The United States has long had the Chafee Amendment, which among other things allows for the existence of the National Library Service for the Blind and Print Disabled. However, this copyright exemption before the treaty only applied to previously published nondramatic literary works. In contrast, Australia prior to the treaty already had copyright exemptions that applied to all literary and dramatic works. Establishing a treaty had as a goal creating one set of rules to help facilitate sharing of all manner of works across international borders.

Treaty 
The treaty allows for copyright exceptions to facilitate the creation of accessible versions of books and other copyrighted works for visually impaired persons. It sets a norm for countries ratifying the treaty to have a domestic copyright exception covering these activities and allowing for the import and export of such materials.

Sixty-three countries signed the treaty as of the close of the diplomatic conference in Marrakesh. The ratification of 20 states was required for the treaty to enter into effect; the 20th ratification was received on 30 June 2016, and the treaty entered into force on 30 September 2016.

Ratification 
India was the first country to ratify the treaty, on 24 July 2014. As of October 15, 2018, 80 countries have signed the Treaty and 117 states have ratified it including  EU's 28 member-states who ratified as one entity (notification number 45), and most recently Barbados.

The European Union ratified the treaty for all 28 members on October 1, 2018. The provisions of the Treaty went into effect across the EU (including in the United Kingdom) on January 1, 2019.

The UK left the EU on January 31, 2020. but was covered by the EU's ratification of the treaty until December 31, 2020. The UK deposited their instrument of ratification on October 1, 2020. This meant that on January 1, 2021, the UK became a contracting party in its own right.

On September 20, 2017, the EU Commission published a directive and a regulation on the Marrakesh treaty that had to be transposed into national law, in all 28 member states; the deadline for transposition was October 11, 2018. Member states were required to update their national laws to implement the Treaty's requirements later in 2018. This followed a lengthy and occasionally controversial process that began shortly after the treaty was initially passed. In March 2015, the Council of the European Union accused the European Commission of delaying the adoption of the treaty by EU and called upon the Commission "to submit without delay the necessary legislative proposal". There was continued opposition by some EU member states.

On June 28, 2018, the U.S. Senate approved it and the implementation bill  without apparent opposition; the House approved S.2559 via unanimous consent on September 25, 2018. The bill and the Treaty were signed into law by the President Trump on October 9, 2018. As a result, on February 8, 2019, the United States of America formally joined the treaty.

Countries which have ratified the treaty 
By February 20, 2023, 92 Contracting Parties (118 countries) around the world had ratified or acceded to the Marrakesh treaty. See table below:

Notes

Initiatives 
The Accessible Books Consortium (ABC), launched in 2014, was conceived as "one possible initiative, among others, to concretely achieve the goals of the Marrakesh Treaty ".  ABC aims to increase the number of books worldwide in accessible formats – such as braille, audio and large print – and to make them available to people who are blind, have low vision or are otherwise print disabled.

References

External links 
 The Marrakesh Treaty on WIPO
 Contracting Parties > Marrakesh VIP Treaty (WIPO official list of signatories)
 The full text of the Marrakesh Treaty to Facilitate Access to Published Works for Persons Who Are Blind, Visually Impaired or Otherwise Print Disabled  in the WIPO Lex database — official website of WIPO.

2013 in Morocco
Treaties concluded in 2013
Copyright treaties
Treaties of Argentina
Treaties of Australia
Treaties of Brazil
Treaties of Canada
Treaties of Chile
Treaties of Ecuador
Treaties of El Salvador
Treaties of Guatemala
Treaties of India
Treaties of Israel
Treaties of Mali
Treaties of Mexico
Treaties of Mongolia
Treaties of North Korea
Treaties of Paraguay
Treaties of Peru
Treaties of Singapore
Treaties of South Korea
Treaties of the United Arab Emirates
Treaties of the United States
Treaties of Uruguay
World Intellectual Property Organization treaties
Treaties entered into force in 2016
Blindness equipment